Emiljano Vila (born 12 March 1988) is an Albanian professional footballer who plays as an attacking midfielder for Teuta Durrës in the Albanian Superliga and the Albania national football team.

Club career

Early career
Vila started his career with his hometown team, Teuta Durrës in 2006. He made his debut on 26 November 2006 in an away match against Partizani Tirana. Vila came on for Bledar Mancaku in the 77th minute of the game. His first goal came in only his 8th career appearance on 10 March 2007 against Luftetari Gjirokaster. Vila was on the pitch for the full 90 minutes and scored the opening goal in the 47th minute. The match ended 3–0 for Teuta Durrës after two further goals by Daniel Xhafa and Bledar Mancaku.

Dinamo Zagreb
He signed a 4-year contract with Croatian champions Dinamo Zagreb on 19 June 2009 and was sent on loan at fellow Croatian side Lokomotiva Zagreb without playing any match for the club.

Dinamo Tirana
After a brief spell in Croatia, Vila decided to return in Albania where he signed with capital club of Dinamo Tirana for a fee of $55.000, with Vila earning €30,000 a season. He made his debut with Dinamo on 25 January 2010 in the first match of the second part of the season against Tirana, playing full-90 minutes in a 2–1 win.

PAS Giannina
Vile reached a verbal agreement to join international teammate Andi Lila at Greek side PAS Giannina on 30 June 2011, and completed a medical the next day to complete his move. He scored his 1st goal in the Superleague Greece in the match against Panaitolikos, by scoring the winning goal of his team in the 71st minute. He also helped his team achieve its 2nd away consecutive win against PAOK, by scoring his 1st goal of his team on the 7th minute.

Partizani Tirana
Vila returned in Albania in August 2014 to sign a one-year contract with an option of a further one with capital club Partizani Tirana. He aimed the championship title during his presentation and took squad number 88. He then flew op to Bulgaria to link up with the rest of the squad in their summer training camp. Following the end of summer transfer market, Partizani had made 32 transfers in an out, a record in Albanian football.

Vila's transfer to Partizani was opposed by Albania senior team manager Gianni De Biasi, stating that he made a mistake by returning in Albania. His statements where opposed by Albanian Football Association president Armand Duka, who replied that Vila did not make a mistake by moving to Partizani.

Vila made his competitive debut for Partizani in the opening matchday of 2014–15 Albanian Superliga against Laçi, playing 78 minutes in a 1–1 away draw. Vila was chosen as the next penalty taker following the 0–1 loss at Apolonia Fier after capitain Nderim Nexhipi missed a penalty.

His home debut occurred on 11 September in the match versus Skënderbeu Korçë, netting his maiden Partizani goal via a penalty kick in the 90th minute to give the Red Bull the first league win of season. He dedicated the goal to manager Shpëtim Duro and club fans.

Later on 26 October Vila missed a penalty kick in the matchday 9 versus newly promoted Elbasani; his shot was saved by veteran goalkeeper Elvis Kotorri; this chance didn't fatal as Partizani won 1–0 thanks to a Stevan Račić goal. He ended his first part of the league by scoring once in nine appearances, with Partizani who finished the first part of the season with 18 points, tied with rivals of Tirana as a leader.

Inter Baku
On 20 September 2015, Vila signed a six-month contract with Azerbaijan Premier League side Inter Baku PIK.

Return to Partizani Tirana

On 20 January 2016, Vila signed a one-and-a-half contract with his former club Partizani Tirana, returning there for the second part of 2015–16 season. On 13 May 2016, with the match against Skënderbeu Korçë approaching injury time, he scored a full volley goal to give Partizani the 1–0 victory at Skënderbeu Stadium and retain the title hopes alive.

Vila left the club in the first days of January 2018 after being excluded from winter training camp in Antalya.

Skënderbeu Korçë
On 13 January 2018, Skënderbeu Korçë announced to have sign Vila on an 18-month contract. After signing the contract, Vila flew out to Antalya, Turkey to link up with the rest of the squad on their winter training camp. He made his league debut his new club on 26 January 2018 in a 2–0 away loss to Luftëtari Gjirokastër. He scored his first league goal for Skenderbeu as part of a brace on 18 February 2018 in a 2–1 away victory over FC Kamza. His goals, scored in the 55th and 69th minutes, led Skenderbeu to a come from behind victory.

International career
Vila made his debut for the full national team on 11 June 2009 in a friendly match against Georgia, starting and playing 80 minutes in a 1–1 home draw. He scored on his second international appearance against Cyprus at home to help Albania to win 6–1, recording the biggest win in its history.

He also played for the national team in a friendly against Milan at Qemal Stafa Stadium which ended 3–3. Vila scored one of the goals however that goal was not count for statistics of the senior team, because the match was not played against another national team.

He scored his third goal for Albania on 8 June 2014, playing as a starter against San Marino and scoring the third goal in the 73rd minute in an eventual 3–0 away win.

Career statistics

Club

International

International goals
As of match played 14 November 2014. Albania score listed first, score column indicates score after each Vila goal.

Honours

Club
Dinamo Tirana

Albanian Superliga: 2009–10
Albanian Cup: 2010–11

Individual
Albanian Superliga Talent of the Season: 2008–09

References

External links
 

1988 births
Living people
Footballers from Durrës
Albanian footballers
Association football midfielders
Albania international footballers
KF Teuta Durrës players
GNK Dinamo Zagreb players
NK Lokomotiva Zagreb players
FK Dinamo Tirana players
PAS Giannina F.C. players
FK Partizani Tirana players
Shamakhi FK players
KF Skënderbeu Korçë players
PAE Kerkyra players
Kategoria Superiore players
Croatian Football League players
Azerbaijan Premier League players
Super League Greece players
Albanian expatriate footballers
Expatriate footballers in Croatia
Albanian expatriate sportspeople in Croatia
Expatriate footballers in Greece
Albanian expatriate sportspeople in Greece
Expatriate footballers in Azerbaijan
Albanian expatriate sportspeople in Azerbaijan